Józef Franciszek Darzyn Ciemiński (Borzyszkowy, 4 August 1867-Winona, 1959) was a Polish-born Roman Catholic priest. He emigrated with his parents to the United States in 1881 and was ordained as a Priest in Saint Paul, Minnesota in 1895. He was involved with numerous Polish Catholic parishes during his lifetime including the now closed troubled Parish of Saints Peter and Paul in Duluth, Minnesota, and the parish of Holy Cross in Minneapolis.

Biography
He was born in the Kaszubian village of Borzyszkowy, near Bytow. He was the first of ten children born to Franciszek and Maryanna Darzyn Cieminski, who emigrated from Prussian Poland (Kashubia) to the United States in 1881 aboard the paddle steamer Grimsby, which made him a participant in the Kashubian diaspora.  The humble peasant boy's fifty-one years as a Roman Catholic priest would take him from the post of archdiocesan Secretary to the rectory of a Polish colony on the Minnesota frontier, and from Minneapolis troubleshooter to respected patriarch of Winona's Kaszubian Polish community. Kashubian born and American educated, Father Joseph F. Cieminski exemplified through his long and accomplished life the hard work and achievements of America's Kashubian Polish community.

Young Jozef studied in Winona schools until he went away to seminary. He was then ordained in Saint Paul, in 1895. Father Cieminski's first assignment was as secretary to Reverend John Ireland, first Archbishop of Saint Paul. The strong-minded Archbishop Ireland was no admirer of Eastern Europeans, or of Poles in particular. But Father Cieminski's talents were soon needed elsewhere. His first parish assignment transferred him to Saint Stanislaus Kostka in the newly established Diocese of Winona, where he served as assistant to the pastor, Father Jakub W.J. Pacholski. The fact that Archbishop Ireland dispatched his secretary out of the diocese to work alongside the extremely capable Father Pacholski suggests that the disturbances at Saint Stanislaus were more substantial than the available information would indicate.

Wilno, Minnesota
Father Cieminski's next assignment, in Wilno, Minnesota, returned him to the Archdiocese of Saint Paul. The Polish colony in Wilno had been established in 1883 under the auspices of the Archdiocese and the Chicago and Northwestern Railroad. It represented an attempt to steer underemployed Polish-American urbanites into the Archdiocese of Saint Paul's wide-open western spaces; a recent article by John Radzilowski treats Wilno as an exemplar of Polish-American farm life. Radzilowski also chronicles Archbishop Ireland's ham-fisted attempt to control Wilno's  Saint John Cantius Parish by replacing a popular Polish-speaking priest with an unfortunate Bohemian priest who (due solely to his ethnicity) was run out of the parish in some time.

From 1896 to 1902, Father Jan Andrzejewski had labored to build for St. John Cantius what Father Waclaw Kruszka describes as "a new, spacious, and magnificent temple,"  only to depart just before the building's consecration in a confrontation (according to the 1983 Parish Jubilee Book) over the church organ. Arriving in 1902, Father Cieminski brought the parish back into line despite the fact that Father Andrezejewski remained in Wilno for quite some time. In 1906, Father Cieminski also engaged the School Sisters of Saint Francis from Rochester (otherwise known as the Rochester Franciscans) to staff Saint John Cantius's elementary school. In 1907 Father Cieminski was recalled by the Diocese of Winona as pastor of Saint Casimir's Church in Wells, Minnesota; his three years in the little Faribault County town appear to have been free of any major troubles.

Duluth
In 1910, Father Cieminski transferred to Duluth, Minnesota, to serve as pastor to the troubled parish of Saints Peter and Paul (now closed). Duluth's second Polish Catholic church had become a battleground between the Diocese of Duluth and a group of "independent" parishioners determined to bring it into the Polish National Catholic Church. Already a group of "independents" had seceded from Duluth's first Polish Catholic church, Saint Mary Star of the Sea, resulting in the 1907 foundation of Saint Josephat's Polish National Church. The legal battle over Saints Peter and Paul had been won, but Father Cieminski had to spend the next five years putting the parish of Saints Peter and Paul back in order.

Minneapolis
1915 saw Father Cieminski moving to another trouble spot, the parish of Holy Cross in Minneapolis, founded in 1886 by his mentor and friend, Father Pacholski. Holy Cross had been in turmoil for several years, due to a scandal which possibly involved its longtime pastor, Father Henryk Jazdzewski. Sensing an opportunity, a faction of "independents" had already broken away from Holy Cross and founded Sacred Heart Polish National Church. Another such faction had arisen and was trying to take over Holy Cross itself.

On March 4, 1916, Father Cieminski's task became further complicated when Father Jazdzewski was shot and killed in the rectory of Saint Casimir's Parish in Minneapolis by a former Holy Cross parishioner. Again, Father Cieminski successfully healed a congregation and brought it safely back into the fold.

Winona
In 1932, Father Cieminski, now aged 65, replaced the late Father Pacholski as pastor of Saint Stanislaus Kostka in Winona. For the first time in his career as a priest, Father Cieminski had the enviable task of building upon an already rock solid foundation. Having succeeded in the most difficult positions that three separate Minnesota dioceses could find for him, he had no difficulty following in Father Pacholski's giant footsteps. Instead, he went on to become a beloved pastor and a respected figure in the Winona community, no doubt helped by the fact that he was Kashubian born and Winona raised, serving in the "Kashubian Capital of America." In 1943, his exemplary efforts were rewarded when Pope Pius XII raised him to the rank of Monsignor. In 1946, his retirement after fifty-one years in the priesthood was celebrated with an outpouring of gratitude of respect from his parishioners, his fellow priests, and the Winona community.

Father Joseph F. Cieminski died in a Saint James, Minnesota, retirement facility on November 19, 1959. Over his ninety-two years he had experienced - and taken an integral part in - dramatic changes for both the Roman Catholic Church in Minnesota and the Kashubian community of the Upper Mississippi Valley. He lies buried in Winona, among other members of the Cieminski family, in Saint Mary's Cemetery.

References

1867 births
1959 deaths
American people of Kashubian descent
People from Winona, Minnesota
20th-century American Roman Catholic priests
Polish emigrants to the United States
Kashubian clergy
Roman Catholic Diocese of Duluth
Roman Catholic Archdiocese of Saint Paul and Minneapolis
Roman Catholic Diocese of Winona-Rochester
Catholics from Minnesota